Sale Marasino is a comune in the province of Brescia, Lombardy, northern Italy. It is situated on the east shore of Lake Iseo.

References

Cities and towns in Lombardy